Aardklop is an annual South African arts festival held in Potchefstroom, South Africa. Potchefstroom has always been a cultural city and home to several well-known South African writers and artists.

The Aardklop National Arts Festival has been in existence from 1998 and has since become a bastion of arts and culture in South Africa. The festival incorporates predominantly, but not exclusively, Afrikaans theatre, music, cabaret and visual arts, presented in a variety of venues across the town.

A large crafts market and open-air performances also form an integral part of the festival. The event annually draws more than 700 artists over a period of 6 days.

The festival not only plays a huge role in the local economy of Potchefstroom, but also contributes largely to the economy of the greater North West Province.

See also
Woordfees
Vrystaat Kunstefees
KKNK
kykNET
Media24
North West University
Naspers

References

 Aardklop se hart klop weer pure kuns
 Beeld sê: Fees klop toe die doemprofete
 Aardklop groter, kleiner, beter
 Potch-kunstefees bly ‘Aardklop’ 
 Aardklop nou ‘gewildste kunstefees’ ná doodsklok eens lui

External links
(Afrikaans)

Arts festivals in South Africa
Potchefstroom
Afrikaans
Tourist attractions in North West (South African province)